Xiangfeng Station is a metro station of Line 1 of the Fuzhou Metro. It is located on Xiufeng Road and Manyang Road intersection in Jin'an District, Fuzhou, Fujian, China. The station is also a northern terminus of Line 1. It started operation on Jan 6, 2017.

References 

Railway stations in China opened in 2017
Fuzhou Metro stations